Vasiliy Stepanovich Bebko (26 April 1932 – 20 February 2022) was a Ukrainian-born Russian diplomat. He served as Ambassador of the USSR and later Russia to Liberia from 1987 to 1992. 

Bebko died on 20 February 2022, at the age of 89.

References

1932 births
2022 deaths
Russian diplomats
Soviet diplomats
Ambassador Extraordinary and Plenipotentiary (Soviet Union)
Ambassadors of the Soviet Union to Liberia
Ambassadors of Russia to Liberia
Russian people of Ukrainian descent
Communist Party of the Soviet Union members
Recipients of the Order of the Red Banner of Labour
People from Zaporizhzhia